Rhipha mathildae is a moth in the family Erebidae. It was described by Paul Köhler in 1926. It is found in Argentina.

References

Moths described in 1926
Phaegopterina